Bracebridge Hall is a historic plantation house and national historic district located near Macclesfield, Edgecombe County, North Carolina. The district encompasses eight contributing buildings, two contributing sites, and three contributing structures associated with the Bracebridge Hall plantation complex. The original house was built about 1830–1832, and enlarged about 1835–1840, 1880–1881, and 1885.  It is a two-story, five bay, weatherboarded frame dwelling with Greek Revival and Victorian style design elements.  It features a one-story Doric order portico.  Also on the property are the contributing Metal boiler/basin (c. 1880–1900), Plantation Office (c. 1860–1885), Servants’ House (Aunt Pattie's House) (c. 1860–1885), Tobacco Barn (c. 1920), Troughs (c. 1890–1920), Large Barn (c. 1890–1915), Barn (c. 1920), Overseer's House (c. 1860–1885), Carr Cemetery (1820), and the Agricultural landscape.  Buried in the cemetery is North Carolina Governor Elias Carr (1839-1900) and his wife Eleanor Kearny Carr (1840–1912).

It was listed on the National Register of Historic Places in 1971, with a boundary increase in 2005.

References

Plantation houses in North Carolina
Houses on the National Register of Historic Places in North Carolina
Farms on the National Register of Historic Places in North Carolina
Historic districts on the National Register of Historic Places in North Carolina
Greek Revival houses in North Carolina
Victorian architecture in North Carolina
Houses completed in 1835
Houses in Edgecombe County, North Carolina
National Register of Historic Places in Edgecombe County, North Carolina
1835 establishments in North Carolina
Carr family residences